Members of the New South Wales Legislative Assembly who served in the 42nd parliament held their seats from 1968 to 1971. They were elected at the 1968 state election, and at by-elections. The Speaker was Sir Kevin Ellis.

See also
Second Askin ministry
Third Askin ministry
Results of the 1968 New South Wales state election
Candidates of the 1968 New South Wales state election

References

Members of New South Wales parliaments by term
20th-century Australian politicians